Ponticola gorlap, or the Caspian bighead goby, is a species of goby, a benthic fish  native to the Caspian Sea basin. It is widespread in lower parts of many rivers in Iran, and also found in Azerbaijan and Turkmenistan. In Russia, it occurred in the lowest part of the Volga River up to Astrakhan until 1977, but has thereafter spread upstream.  In 2000 it was recorded as being established in the Ivankovo and Rybinsk Reservoirs in the Moscow region, and already invaded the Don drainage by way of the Volga-Don Canal in 1972.  This species occurs in sheltered environments, such as inshore fresh or brackish waters of estuaries, lagoons, lakes and large rivers, where it prefers habitats with a well vegetated rock or firmly packed sand substrate.  It can reach a length of  SL, and a common size is  SL.

External links

Ponticola
Fish of Asia
Fish of Russia
Fish of the Caspian Sea
Fish described in 1949
Endemic fauna of the Caspian Sea